The Deptford Township Schools is a comprehensive community public school district, comprising eight school facilities, that serves students in pre-kindergarten through twelfth grade in Deptford Township, in Gloucester County, New Jersey.

As of the 2020–21 school year, the district, comprised of eight schools, had an enrollment of 3,942 students and 329.8 classroom teachers (on an FTE basis), for a student–teacher ratio of 12.0:1.

The district is classified by the New Jersey Department of Education as being in District Factor Group "CD", the sixth-highest of eight groupings. District Factor Groups organize districts statewide to allow comparison by common socioeconomic characteristics of the local districts. From lowest socioeconomic status to highest, the categories are A, B, CD, DE, FG, GH, I and J.

Schools
Schools in the district (with 2020–21 enrollment data from the National Center for Education Statistics) are:
Early childhood
Central Early Childhood Center with 489 students in grades PreK-1
Maria Gioffre, Principal
Pine Acres Early Childhood Center with 240 students in grades PreK-1
Shelli Jones, Principal
Elementary schools
Good Intent School with 334 students in grades 2-6
Kimberly Matthews, Principal
Lake Tract School with 382 students in grades 2-6
Cheryl Battee, Principal
Oak Valley School with 354 students in grades 2-6
John Schilling, Principal
Shady Lane School with 361 students in grades 2-6
Heather Jackson, Principal
Middle school
Monongahela Middle School with 704 students in grades 7&8
Jonathan Collins, Principal
High school
Deptford Township High School with 1,009 students in grades 9-12
Jeff Lebb, Principal
Special education
Deptford Transitional Learning Academy which helps students with developmental or cognitive disabilities ages 14 to 21 learn life and career skills.
Michael Nicely, Principal

Administration
Core members of the district's administration are:
Arthur Dietz, Superintendent
Todd D. Reitzel, Business Administrator / Board Secretary

Board of education
The district's board of education is comprised of nine members who set policy and oversee the operation of the district by its administration. As a Type II school district, the members are directly elected by voters to three-year terms of office on a staggered basis, so that three seats are up for election each year held as part of the November general election since 2012. The board appoints a superintendent to oversee the district's day-to-day operations and a business administrator to supervise the business functions of the district.

References

External links
Deptford Township Schools
 
School Data for the Deptford Township Schools, National Center for Education Statistics

Deptford Township, New Jersey
New Jersey District Factor Group CD
School districts in Gloucester County, New Jersey